The Watchman is a  sandstone mountain summit located in Zion National Park, in Washington County of southwest Utah, United States.

Description

Zion's park headquarters, the park's south entrance, and Watchman Campground are situated immediately north-northwest of the mountain, which makes it one of the photographic icons of the park. The Watchman is wedged between the North and East Forks of the Virgin River which drain precipitation runoff from this mountain. Its neighbors include Mount Kinesava directly across the canyon to the west, Bridge Mountain,  to the north-northeast, and The West Temple is positioned  to the northwest. This feature's name was officially adopted in 1934 by the U.S. Board on Geographic Names. It is believed to be so named because it stands as a watchman guarding the south entrance to the park. It is unclear where the name may have originated; some believe it was Methodist Minister Frederick Vining Fisher. Early pioneers referred to this peak as Flanigan Peak because the Flanigan family homestead was set at the base of this feature. This mountain is composed of Navajo Sandstone, with a red shale outcropping of the Kayenta Formation along the lower slopes.

Climate
Spring and fall are the most favorable seasons to visit The Watchman. According to the Köppen climate classification system, it is located in a Cold semi-arid climate zone, which is defined by the coldest month having an average mean temperature below , and at least 50% of the total annual precipitation being received during the spring and summer.

Gallery

See also

 Geology of the Zion and Kolob canyons area
 Colorado Plateau

References

External links

 Zion National Park National Park Service
 Weather: The Watchman
 The Watchman Rock Climbing: mountainproject.com

Mountains of Utah
Zion National Park
Mountains of Washington County, Utah
Climbing areas of the United States
Sandstone formations of the United States
Landforms of Washington County, Utah